United Nations Security Council resolution 742, adopted without a vote on 14 February 1992, after examining the application of the Azerbaijani Republic for membership in the United Nations, the Council recommended to the General Assembly that Azerbaijan be admitted.

See also
 Member states of the United Nations
 List of United Nations Security Council Resolutions 701 to 800 (1991–1993)

References
Text of the Resolution at undocs.org

External links
 

 0742
 0742
 0742
1992 in Azerbaijan
February 1992 events